The Chavarri Palace is a building in the Flemish style in the city of Bilbao, the most outstanding around the Moyúa Square. It was built in the early 20th century and its style resembles the palaces built during the Renaissance in Antwerp or Bruges.

One of the most interesting features of the buildings is that none of the sets of windows is the same as any other.

The palace accommodates the representation of the Government of Spain in the province of Biscay.

Notes and references

Sources
 Elías Mas Serra El Palacio Chavarri, in the monthly magazine Bilbao, August 2006
 Pérez de la Peña Oleaga, Gorka (2005): Guía de arquitectura urbana de Bilbao: Cien obras maestras. Ed. Guías Cruziales
 Álvaro Chapa and Susana Chávarri (2014): El Palacio Chávarri

Buildings and structures in Bilbao
Palaces in the Basque Country (autonomous community)